John Bourke (born 31 December 1953) is a Scottish former footballer who played as a striker for a number of Scottish clubs, including Dumbarton (twice), Dundee United and Kilmarnock (twice). Bourke made more than 400 league appearances during his playing career.

After his football career, Bourke became a secondary school teacher, teaching physical education.

References

External links

1953 births
Living people
Footballers from Glasgow
Association football forwards
Scottish footballers
Dumbarton F.C. players
Dundee United F.C. players
Kilmarnock F.C. players
Brechin City F.C. players
Scottish Football League players